Thuravoor is a gram panchayat in the Pattanakkad Block of Cherthala Taluk of the Alappuzha District, State of Kerala, India. It comes under Aroor Assembly constituency. Thuravoor lies exactly between Kochi and Alappuzha. A four lane National Highway 47 passes through the village, which along with a railway station gives it excellent connectivity with the remainder of the state. Thuravoor is famous for the Narasimha Swamy temple which is dedicated to the fourth incarnation (avatara) of Vishnu, the Narasimha.  The temple has two main deities, the Vadakkanappan (Lord Narasimha) and the Tekkanappan (Lord Sudarshana), which is rare among the temples of Kerala.

Location

Thuravoor Mahakshethram 

Thuravoor Mahakshethram, an ancient Devasthanam located by the side of NH-47, approximately 25 km south of Kochi city, is the sacred abode of Lord Sree Narasimhamoorthy and Lord Sree Mahasudarsanamoorthy.  The entire temple complex can be seen from the road.
	
Two separate Sanctom Sanctoroms in close proximity - within the same compound - reflect the synthesis of a unique and mysterious divine power.  The idol of Sree Narasimhamoorthy is said to have originated in the holy city of Kashi (Varanasi).  Swami Padmapadar (8th century AD), the principal disciple of Adi Sankaracharya, had worshipped the very same idol at Kashi.
	
Distinctive in its architectural and artistic grandeur, Thuravoor Mahakshethram is one of the most venerated places of worship in Kerala.  Twin Sreekovils (Sanctom Sanctoroms) - one square and the other circular shaped - in a single Nalambalam, two gold-plated flagmasts that tower into the skies, a majestically tall Anapandhal (elephant rostrum, the largest in Kerala) and a strict regimen of observances of vrathas for the priests, days after days of rituals and festivals, chanting of Vedic hymns and presentation of learned discourses on Puranas throughout the year... all these attract streams of devotees to the temple from within and outside the state. Vedi - vazhivadu is one of the popular vazhivadu or offerings in the temple.

Of the two temples here, it is believed that the one dedicated to Sudarsanamoorthy was the first to come into existence. Though there is no record of its origin, the temple is estimated to be over 1300 years old.  There are scholars who hold that the circular-shaped Sreekovil belongs to the Treta Yuga; according to others, its origin dates back to the Dvapara Yuga.  Some palm leaf texts on the temple do exist, but nobody has yet been able to understand or decipher them.
	
As for the Narasimhamoorthy temple, records do show that it came into being sometime in the 7th century AD, during the reign of a Chera king named Keralendran.  His guru was the great Muringottu Adigal, a well-known Tulu Brahmin priest and scholar.
	
Geographically, the temple site belongs to the formerly Princely State of Cochin. However, it subsequently came under the purview of Travancore State for certain political reasons. But this transition was subject to an important proviso:  if a Travancore king were ever to set foot on the Mahakshethra soil, the temple would be immediately restored to Cochin.  Therefore, for a long time, no Travancore king visited the temple.  In 1951, with the merger of Travancore and Cochin and coronation of Sree Chithira Thirunal, the Maharaja visited the temple - the first time for a Travancore king to do so. He walked to the temple over a carpet to avoid stepping directly on the ground.

Daily routine/rituals like puja, kazhagam are entrusted to some designated families. Even now also puja has to be carried out by five vaishnava Tulu Brahmin families, say Adukathaya (Adukkam), Kubanuraya (Konoor), Parakode, Khajanaya (Kasha)and Kadamannaya (Nallur) of Kasargode District of Kerala.

Great seers and saints such as Jagadguru Sankaracharya of Sringeri - Sree Bharathi Theertha Swamigal, Jagadguru Sankaracharya of Kanchi - Sree Jayendra Saraswathy, Sankaracharya of Puri - Sree Adhokshajananda Swamigal, Uduppi Pejavar Math head - Sree Visweswara Theertha Swamigal and the Jiyar of Ahobilamath - Sree Sadagopa Narayana Yatheendra Swamigal - have all visited and experienced the spiritual and devotional grandeur of this fabled Devasthanam.

Thuravoor Mahakshethram is now one of the important transit-camps (Edathavalam) for the Ayappa devotees during the Sabarimala pilgrimage season. The temple is administered by the Travancore Devasom Board. The Devasom guest house and a large spacious hall for conducting religious discourses, marriage functions are also located just near the southern gate of the temple.

The 29-th Akhila Bharath SriMad Bhagavath Mahasathram, a fourteen-day non stop religious discourse camp or Mahasathram was held at Thuravoor Mahakesthram from 2 April 2012 to 14 April 2012. The Bhagavata Sathram is a conglomeration of learned rishis, priests, scholars and devotees to share their knowledge and experiences on Bhagavatam and everybody can take part in the Bhajans, discussions and deliberations on the teachings of "Sreemad Bhagavatam". The gracious presence of Lord Guruvayoorappan was there at the venue of the Sathram on all the days. It was a divine opportunity for the Devotees to attend the Sathram and offer their prayers and be blessed by Lord Guruvayoorappan. Bhagavatha acharyas and scholars from all over the country participated and rendered their scholarly discourses to the devotees, dedicated to Lord Guruvayoorappan.

Thuravoor Purandareswaram Temple 

The incarnation of Lord Shiva at Purandareswarath Sree Maha Deva Temple believed as a form of Sharabha. The incarnation of lord Sarabha is that mellowed Lord Vishnu's ominous form of the breast-bursting, blood-sucking Narasimha. He is the heavenly deliverer of mental bliss. Praying to him can make anyone "calm of mind, all passion spent". So, Purandareswarath Sree Maha Deva Temple has a primordial relation to the legendary Narasimhamoorthy Temple, Thuravoor. As Mammiyoor Siva Temple is to Guruvayoor Sree Krishna Temple, so is Purandareswarath Maha Deva Temple to Thuravoor Narasimhamoorthy Temple. Of these different deities 'ceremonially arriving' at Thuravoor on the holy Deepavali Festival Day for the ritualistic ensemble called "Kootti Ezhunnellath", Lord Purandareswara is the lone Siva deity among the other deities. So, every devotee who goes to Thuravoor Mahakshethram is supposed to go to Purandareswaram Kshethram also, as the ritual goes.

Legend has it that a holy Brahmin bound for Vaikom to participate in the "Vaikathashtami" and to have "Ashtami Darsan", could reach only up to Purandareswarath. Heart-broken at the thought of is failure to reach Vaikom in time and to have Ashtami – Darshan, he cried and prayed Lord Siva in penitence. Lord Siva heard his passionate prayer and emerged before him in all his charismatic grace. Later that Siva grace was identified by Sri. Vilvamangalathu Swamiyar, the seer and saint of ancient Kerala and he enshrined it in the round-shaped abode of the temple.

The main festival of Purandareswaram Temples are Maha Shivaratri, Ashtami Darsan,  Pathamudayam, Thiruvathira  and Deepavali. One of the famous festival in that village

Kadathuruth Srimahadevi Temple 

Thuravoor Kadathuruth Srimahadevi Temple is one of the prominent Devi temples in Alappuzha. It is situated 2 km away from Thuravoor junction.  The idol of the goddess Bhadrakali (popularly known as "Kadathuruth Amma") in the temple is unique as it has four hands with various attributes. One is holding the head of a Daruka, another a sword, next an anklet, another a bell. It is popularly called "Kadathuruthil Chakki".

Parayakad Nalukulangara Maha Devi Temple 

kuthiathode between Thuravoor NH 47, western side of around 1 km Road (Pattukulangara Jn.) one of the prominent Devi temples in Alappuzha. It is situated 1 km away from Pattukulangara Jn.  The idol of the goddess Bhadrakali (popularly known as "Nalukulangara Amma")  together with Sivan, Subrahmanyan, Bhalabhadra, etc. It is popularly called"Nalukulangara Mahadevi".

Temple Annual Fest (KODIYETTU ULSAVOM - MALAYALAM KALANDER MAKAROM -  MAKOM THOZHAL andery famous & POORAM popular. Vrichikom 1st PONGALA especially ladies' fest.

Temples and churches 
 Thuravoor Mahakshetram
 Purandareswaram Sree Mahadevar Templ
 29th Akhila Bharath SriMad Bhagavath Mahasathram
 Thirumala Devasom Lakshmi Narashimha Temple
 Sacred Heart Church, Valamangalam
 Kadathuruth SriMahadavi Temple
 Sree Bhoothanilam Temple, Valamangalam South
 Mannath Sreekrishna Swamy Temple, Valamangalam
 Pattathalil Sreekrishna Swamy Temple, Thuravoor South
 Thiru Venkitapuram Sreekrishna Swamy Temple, Valamangalam South
 Kainikaramana Sreekrsihna Swamy Temple, Thuravoor 
 Nalukulangara Maha Devi Temple , Parayakad
 Kalarikakkal Devi Temple, Thirumala Bhagaom
 Puthankavu Devi Temple, Puthankavu
 Pechi Amman Kovil, Thuravoor South
 St. Joseph Church, Aalakaparambu
 St.Sebastin's Church, Pallithode
 Sri Mahadeva Temple, Thirumala Bhagom
 Arthikulangara Bhagavathi Temple, Thirumala Bhagom
 Ponnpuram Jamat Mosque, Chavady
 Vadekkuttu Sree Bhagavathy Temple Valamangalam South P.O.
 St. Monica's Church, Mariyapuram, Near Thuravoor Railway station

Personalities 
 Professor Thuravoor Viswambharan - a well known Vedic scholar who presents the vedic discourses on Amrita TV
 Syam Pushkaran is an Indian scriptwriter best known for his work in Malayalam cinema

Educational institutions 

 T D Schools, TirumalaBhagom
One of the oldest and reputed educational institutes in Cherthala is run by Alappuzha Ananthanarayanapuram Thuravoor Thirumala Devasom (AATTD) belonging to the Goud Saraswat Brahmin community. The TD School campus, situated west of Sree Lakshmi Narasimha Temple, Thirumala Bhagom comprises a Teachers' Training Institute (TDTTI) with an Upper Primary (UP) Section, and a Higher Secondary School (TDHSS) with High School (HS) and Higher Secondary Section (HSS). The government run TD Lower Primary School (TDLPS) is also nearby. The school has hosted the Inter-District school level sports and Cultural meet many times. Smt K R Gowri Amma, the former Revenue Minister and Agriculture minister of Kerala state, was a student of TDHSS. The campus is located 2 km west of Thuravoor-NH47 junction.

 SNGM Institutions, Valamangalam, Thuravoor
The Sree Narayana Guru Memorial Charitable and Education (SNGM) Trust offers MEd., BEd., TTC, Hotel Management, Pharmacy and other Professional courses at PostGraduate and graduate level. The campus also has an Art & Science college offering Degree courses affiliated to Kerala University.  Professional courses are approved by AICTE,New Delhi.  It is located at Valamangalam 4 km east of Thuravoor - NH 47 junction.  The K.R. Gowri Amma Engineering college for Women started in 2008 under SNGM Trust, is situated in the same campus.

 SCS High School, Valamangalam
SCS High School, Valamangalam .one of the famous school in Thuravoor. 1 to 10 classes and hire secondary also their. Professional teachers and staffs

 Thuravoor Govt. West UP School, Thuravoor
 Government LP School, Thuravoor, Manakkodam
 Panchayath LP School, Puthanchanda
 St.Joseph's ITI, Thuravoor South

Other public institutions 
The SILK (Steel and Industry limited of Kerala) plant, Higasimaru Feeds, the Government Thaluk Hospital, Thuravoor Educational Sub-district Office, ICDS office, Thuravoor Post office, Panchayat office with a Library,Primary Health Center with mini hospital, Reliance Fuel station, Aswathy HP fuel station, Bank of India, Thuravoor South Service Co-operative Bank, Thuravoor Railway Station, Saral Auditorium, SS Kala Mandir, Thuravoor KalaKethram, and Panchayat Market complex are some of the public institutions around Thuravoor.

References 

Cities and towns in Alappuzha district